Union High School is a public high school in Union, Missouri that is part of the Union R-XI School District, which is MSIP-accredited and in 2001-02 and in 2009-10 was awarded Distinction in Performance by the Missouri Department of Education. Aside from its regular course offerings, students also have the opportunity to participate in extracurricular and vocational programs. In vocational offerings, the Union FFA Chapter was honored in 2002 as one of the top 10 FFA Chapters in the United States.

References

High schools in Franklin County, Missouri
Public high schools in Missouri
1835 establishments in Missouri